= Killer Vamp =

Japanese manga series

- First tankōbon volume cover

血と灰の女王 (Chi to Hai no Joō)
- Genre: Action; Dark fantasy
- Manga
- Written by: Hajime Bako
- Published by: Shogakukan
- English publisher: NA: Comikey
- Imprint: Ura Shōnen Sunday Comics
- Magazine: MangaONE; Ura Sunday
- Original run: December 30, 2016 – May 13, 2025
- Volumes: 25
- icon

Killer Vamp (血と灰の女王, Chi to Hai no Joō; lit."Queen of Blood and Ash"), also known as Killing Vamp, is a Japanese web manga series written and illustrated by Hajime Bako. It was serialized on Shogakukan's MangaONE and Ura Sunday online platforms from December 2016 to May 2025.

== Synopsis ==
The series is set in a Japan, where after the eruption of Mount Fuji, humans who had been exposed to the volcanic ash suddenly became vampires, and those vampires would start to attack each other in battle.

== Media ==
=== Manga ===
Written and illustrated by Hajime Bako, Killer Vamp was serialized on Shogakukan's MangaONE app and Ura Sunday website from December 30, 2016, to May 13, 2025. Its chapters were compiled into twenty-five tankōbon volumes released from May 12, 2017, to August 8, 2025.

The series is licensed in English by Comikey.

No.	Release date	ISBN
1	May 12, 2017	978-4-09-127603-2
2	July 12, 2017	978-4-09-127652-0
3	November 15, 2017	978-4-09-127816-6
4	March 19, 2018	978-4-09-128216-3
5	September 19, 2018	978-4-09-128530-0
6	February 19, 2019	978-4-09-128840-0
7	May 10, 2019	978-4-09-129196-7
8	September 19, 2019	978-4-09-129402-9
9	January 17, 2020	978-4-09-129537-8
10	March 19, 2020	978-4-09-850042-0
11	August 19, 2020	978-4-09-850225-7
12	January 19, 2021	978-4-09-850435-0
13	May 19, 2021	978-4-09-850580-7
14	September 16, 2021	978-4-09-850705-4
15	December 10, 2021	978-4-09-850831-0
16	April 19, 2022	978-4-09-851081-8
17	August 19, 2022	978-4-09-851243-0
18	December 12, 2022	978-4-09-851446-5
19	June 12, 2023	978-4-09-852004-6
20	December 12, 2023	978-4-09-853055-7
21	March 12, 2024	978-4-09-853150-9
22	July 11, 2024	978-4-09-853438-8
23	December 12, 2024	978-4-09-853757-0
24	July 11, 2025	978-4-09-854179-9
25	August 8, 2025	978-4-09-854206-2

=== Light novel ===
A spin-off light novel written by Mujina Imaji, titled Killing Vamp: Beyond and Evil was released on the MangaONE app on September 20, 2019. It was later released as an ebook by Gagaga Books on January 17, 2020.

== Reception ==
The series was ranked seventh in the web category at the fourth Next Manga Awards in 2018.
